Guoco Group Limited (Chinese: 國浩集團有限公司) is an investment holding company. The principal activities of its subsidiaries and associated companies include investment and treasury management, property development and investment, stock and commodity broking, insurance, investment advisory, fund management as well as banking and finance, operating principally in Hong Kong, Singapore, Malaysia and Mainland China, etc. It is part of the Hong Leong Group, a conglomerate in Malaysia.

Guoco Group is incorporated in Bermuda and headquartered in Hong Kong.

See also
Dao Heng Bank

References

External links

Companies listed on the Hong Kong Stock Exchange
Financial services companies of Hong Kong